Caotang Temple is a Buddhist temple located on the north hillside of Mount Guifeng, in Huyi District of Xi'an, Shaanxi, China.

In the Later Qin (384–417), Kumārajīva resided in Caotang Temple, where he translated Madhyamika-sastra, Sata-sastra and Dvadashamukha Shastra, which laid the foundation for the theory of East Asian Mādhyamaka, so he is respected as the founder of East Asian Mādhyamaka and Caotang Temple is considered as the cradle of East Asian Mādhyamaka.

History

Later Qin
Caotang Temple traces its origins to the former Xiaoyang Garden, founded by Emperor Yao Xing of Later Qin (384–417) in 401 in order to provide accommodation for renowned Buddhist missionary monk Kumārajīva.

Sui dynasty
In 606, in the 2nd year of Daye period of Sui dynasty (581–618), Li Yuan, the then prefectural governor of Zhengzhou, visited and presented a Buddha statue to the temple.

Tang dynasty
After the establishment of the Tang Empire (618–907), Emperor Taizong came to worship the Buddha and wrote poems in the temple. During the reign of Emperor Xuanzong (685–762), Master Feixi settled at Caotang Temple, where he taught Buddhism for many years. In the Yuanhe era of Emperor Xianzong (806–820), the emperor issued the decree rebuilding the temple. Master Guifeng Zongmi was proposed as the abbot. Under his leadership, Caotang Temple was refurbished and redecorated and renamed "Qi Chan Temple". After the fall of Tang Empire in the early 10th century, the temple became dilapidated for wars.

Song dynasty
In 966, in the 4th year of Qiande period of the Song dynasty (960–1276), the imperial court renovated the temple and renamed it "Qingliang Jianfu Temple".

Jin dynasty
In 1193, in the reign of Emperor Zhangzong of Jin dynasty (1115–1234), Master Bianzheng added lecture hall and it restored the original name.

Qing dynasty
In 1734, in the Yongzheng era of the Qing dynasty (1644–1911), after the canonization of Kumārajīva's disciple Sengzhao, the temple was renamed "Sheng'en Temple", which means royal graciousness. In the Tongzhi period (1862–1874), the temple was completely destroyed by wars. In 1881 in the Guangxu period (1875–1908), the recently established temple was washed away by the flood.

People's Republic of China
After the founding of PRC, a restoration of the entire temple complex was carried out in 1952. On August 6, 1956, Caotang Temple was listed among the first group of provincial level key cultural heritage by Shaanxi Provincial Government.

Caotang Temple had been designated as a National Key Buddhist Temple in Han Chinese Area by the State Council of China in 1983. In 1984, the temple resumed its religious activities.

Architecture
Main structures from the Shanmen to the Abbot's Room are aligned with the central axis and divided into five countyards. At the very front are Shanmen, followed by Four Heavenly Kings Hall, Mahavira Hall, Dabei Hall (Hall of Great Compassion), Hall of Ksitigarbha, Hall of Three Saints, and finally Abbot's Room in the rear. On both sides of the central axis are Bell Tower, Drum Tower, Memorial Hall of Kumārajīva, stone pagoda, Hall of Reclining Buddha, Pavilion of Guanyin, and ring-rooms.

Shanmen
The hall is flush gable roof style. Under the eaves is a plaque with the Chinese characters "Caotang Temple" written by Zhao Puchu, the then president of the Buddhist Association of China.

Four Heavenly Kings Hall
The Maitreya Buddha and Four Heavenly Kings' statues are enshrined in the Four Heavenly Kings Hall.

Mahavira Hall
The Mahavira Hall enshrining the statues of Sakyamuni, Amitabha and Bhaisajyaguru. The two disciples' statues are placed in front of the statue of Sakyamuni, the older is called Kassapa Buddha and the middle-aged is called Ananda. A plaque with "Mahavira Hall" written by Zhao Puchu is hung on the architrave. The statues of Eighteen Arhats stand on both sides of the hall. The hall has a double-eave gable and hip roof.

Dabei Hall
The Dabei Hall (Hall of Great Compassion) was built in the Qianlong period (1736–1796) of the Qing dynasty (1644–1911). The hall is flush gable roof style. In the center of the eaves of the hall is a plaque "Xiaoyang Sanzang" written by monk Miaokuo in 1947.

Hall of Reclining Buddha
The jade statue of Reclining Buddha enshrined in the hall, which was presented by a Burmese Fu Fengying in 1994.

Dharma Hall

Buddhist Texts Library
The hall started to build in 2005 and completed in October 2014. Five gilded copper statues of Buddha are enshrined in the hall.

Memorial Hall of Kumārajīva
The Memorial Hall of Kumārajīva was built by monks of Japanese Nichiren Buddhism. At the back of his statue is a painting of flying apsaras which was painted by Japanese painter Mise. Several steles of poems written by Zhao Puchu and other Japanese poets are inlaid on the walls.

National Treasures

Stupa of Kumārajīva
The Stupa of Kumārajīva was made of marble in the Later Qin (384–417). It is composed of a base, a sumeru throne and a dense-eave body. The base has three layers with engraved patterns of clouds.

Ming dynasty bell
Outside of the bell cast over 14 Buddhist temples, 200 Buddhist monks and works of Buddhist inscriptions. At the bottom of the bell are engraved with patterns of various flying phoenixes, dragons, lions, Bagua, etc.

References

Bibliography
 

Buddhist temples in Xi'an
Buildings and structures in Xi'an
Tourist attractions in Xi'an
1952 establishments in China
20th-century Buddhist temples
Religious buildings and structures completed in 1952